Gondreville may refer to the following places in France:

 Gondreville, Loiret, a commune in the Loiret department
 Gondreville, Meurthe-et-Moselle, a commune in the Meurthe-et-Moselle department
 Gondreville, Oise, a commune in the Oise department